Hermenegild is a Germanic given name, originally Gothic Ermengild (meaning "immense treasure"). Its most famous bearer was the Visigothic prince Hermenegild, who was later canonised by the Catholic Church. The Spanish and Portuguese form of the name, Hermenegildo, has been popular. The French form is Herménégilde. The names Menendo and Melendo, once popular in Spain, were derived from Hermenegildo, like Mendo, in Portugal. They gave rise to the patronymics Méndez, Meléndez and Menéndez in Spanish and Mendes in Portuguese.

Hermenegild I (Bishop of Oviedo), Asturian ecclesiastic
Hermenegild II, auxiliary bishop
Hermenegild Jireček, Bohemian jurist
Herménégilde Boulay, Canadian politician
Herménégilde Chiasson, Canadian artist
Hermenegildo Anglada Camarasa, Spanish painter
Hermenegildo Capelo, Portuguese explorer
Hermenegildo da Costa Paulo Bartolomeu, Angolan football (soccer) player
Hermenegildo Galeana, Mexican war hero
Hermenegildo González, Galician count
Hermenegildo Sábat, South American caricaturist
Hermenegildo Villanueva, Filipino politician
Ermenegildo Zegna, Italian luxury fashion house

See Also
Ermenegildo, Italian form of the name

Germanic masculine given names